Sparrowlee was the name of a railway station on the Leek and Manifold Valley Light Railway, a   narrow gauge line which ran for 8 miles between Hulme End and Waterhouses, in Staffordshire, and was initially operated by the North Staffordshire Railway before being taken over by the LMS.

The station was opened on 29 June 1904 and was the first halt when travelling north along the valley of the River Hamps between Waterhouses and Beeston Tor, the next station, and the start of the route along the River Manifold.

The station, which was simply a small halt with a grand sign, only in fact served Lee House Farm, for there was no such settlement of this name, and no other community to serve.  A waiting room was consequently not provided, but a siding was provided for the farm's use, and this included a 60-foot standard gauge section, for the use of standard gauge wagons which were carried on special low transporter wagons.

The line closed in 1934, and the route of the railway past the station is now designated the Manifold Way, a walk- and cycle-path.

Route

References

 Keys R and Porter L (1972) The Manifold Valley and its Light Railway, Moorland publishers

External links 
 Sparrowlee Halt on navigable 1921 O. S. map

 

Disused railway stations in Staffordshire
Railway stations in Great Britain opened in 1904
Railway stations in Great Britain closed in 1934
Former Leek and Manifold Light Railway stations